Oxygen is the debut album from French male model and singer Baptiste Giabiconi. It was released on 24 September 2012 on the My Major Company fan-supported record label. The album is in English except for the track "Speed of Light (L'amour et les étoiles)", which is bilingual with some additional French lyrics. It was produced by Pete Boxta Martin and recorded in London. It went straight into #1 on the SNEP official French Albums Chart dated 30 September 2012.

Track listing
"One Night in Paradise" (3:31)
"Unfixable" (feat. J2K) (3:24
"Oxygen" (4:05)
"Sliding Doors" (3:41)
"Speed of Light (L'amour et les étoiles)" (3:29)
"Tomorrow" (4:00)
"Lightyear" (3:57)
"In the Middle of Nowhere" (3:44)
"Bring Me Some Flowers" (3:20)
"Nobody Told Me" (4:22)
"This Ain't Love" (feat. Tania Foster) (3:47)
"New York" (3:16)
"China Girl" (feat. Master Shortie) (3:32)

New edition bonus tracks
14. "One Night in Paradise" (acoustic version) (3:30)
15. "One Night In Paradise" (Hakimakli remix) (3:19)
16. "Là-bas" (Baptiste Giabiconi & Marie-Mai) (4:24)

Charts

References

External links
My Major Company: Baptiste Giabiconi / Oxygen page

2012 debut albums
Baptiste Giabiconi albums